The University of  Mbuji Mayi (UM) is an accredited private university in the Democratic Republic of the Congo, located in the province of Kasai-Oriental, city of Mbuji Mayi. The university is one of the many initiatives by the "Fondation Cardinal Malula". The UM, exists alongside other institutions of higher learning such as the C.U.M (Centre Universitaire de Mbuyi). People mostly mix these two different and separate entities. At its creation, the C.U.M was an Extension of national public universities" amongst which the University of Kinshasa, the University of Lubumbashi and the University of Kisangani. Instruction is in French.

History
The University was created 1 October 2004 as Mbuji Mayi Center University (C.U.K.)  extension of the  University of Kinshasa, and became autonomous in 2010 following Ministerial order No. 157/MINESU/CABMIN/EBK/PK/2010 27 September 2010.

References
 Ministerial Decree No. 157/MINESU/CABMIN/EBK-PK-2010 September 27, 2010, on the empowerment of some extensions of the institutions of higher and university education (article 2 point 8)

Universities in the Democratic Republic of the Congo
Educational institutions established in 2004
2004 establishments in the Democratic Republic of the Congo